Christine McKenna (born 1951) is a British actress active during the 1970s and 1980s, best known for playing "Christina" in the television series Flambards.

McKenna was a drama student at the Royal Scottish Academy of Music and Drama in Glasgow in the early 1970s. During her summer holidays she learned stage management and theatrical wardrobe at the Byre Theatre. Upon graduating, she appeared in productions for the National Theatre and in the West End of London, including Stephen Sondheim´s A Little Night Music with Jean Simmons and Hermione Gingold, A Midsummer Night's Dream, and Great Expectations, and played "Polly" in The Boy Friend with Glynis Johns, "Sally Bowles" in Cabaret, and "Moll" in Moll Flanders.

McKenna was also a member of the Royal Lyceum Theatre company in Edinburgh, and with that company appeared in Kidnapped and The Prime of Miss Jean Brodie and played the "Principal Girl" in several traditional pantomimes.

She starred as Jess in 41 episodes of the popular TV series The Kids from 47A (1973–4), and her other television credits include Georgina Hogarth in Dickens of London with Roy Dotrice (1976), Friends and Other Lovers (1981) for ITV Playhouse, and the film Mask of Murder (1985), however she is probably best known for her starring role as "Christina" in 13 episodes of Flambards (1979).

McKenna relates in her autobiography Why Didn't They Tell The Horses? that when she auditioned for the part of "Christina" in Flambards, her most notable role, she had never ridden a horse before. She was so determined to gain the part that she described the horse-obsessed childhood of a friend as her own and got the part. McKenna then had to learn to ride sidesaddle very quickly.

References

1951 births
British television actresses
British television producers
British women television producers
British stage actresses
Alumni of the Royal Conservatoire of Scotland
Living people